Multilingualism is a part of everyday life for the population of Luxembourg. Legally and socially, different sectors of Luxembourg use French, German, and Luxembourgish, which is a variety of Moselle Franconian, partially mutually intelligible with the neighbouring High German but with a large number of loanwords from French. Additionally, most citizens learn English and may study other languages as well. A substantial immigrant population has brought numerous immigrant languages to the small state, notably Portuguese, which is spoken by more than one-fifth of the population. However, the different languages are used in different social situations.

Official languages
The use of languages for legal and administrative purposes is regulated by a law promulgated in 1984, including the following provisions:

 Article 1: The national language of the Luxembourgers is Luxembourgish.
 Article 2: The laws are in French.
 Article 3: The language of the government: Luxembourgish, German and French can be used.
 Article 4: Administrative questions: If a citizen asks a question in Luxembourgish, German or French, the administration must reply, as far as possible, in the language in which the question was asked.

In many other multilingual countries, such as Belgium, Switzerland and Canada, the distribution of the languages is geographic, but in Luxembourg it is functional—that is, the choice of language depends on the situation.

Education
At school, all students are taught in all three official languages, although divided by age group and subject matter.  At primary school, the courses are taught in German and explanations are often given in Luxembourgish.  In general, at secondary school, up until the 9th grade, every subject is taught in German, except for mathematics and sciences (which are taught in French). From 10th to 13th grade, the language use depends on what level the students are in: In the more difficult level, as well as at the commerce and administrative division, the courses are mostly in French, but throughout the whole of secondary school, explanations are often given in Luxembourgish. The easier level on the other hand tends not to switch to French. As such, Luxembourgers are not able to understand, read, or write French until they are around 8 years old. French always remains a learned (foreign) language for Luxembourgers even though, by the age of 18, the vast majority of them are able to communicate in French on a relatively high level. Due to the high similarity of German to Luxembourgish, and also because German is the first language children are taught (read and write - alphabetization) in school, it is considered by most Luxembourgers their second language, or "reading and writing language".

Government
Government websites are primarily written in French, but there are also parts written for foreigners in other languages such as English and German. In Luxembourg's parliament the Chamber of Deputies, bills are first written in German. Then the language of debate is in Luxembourgish, but sometimes also in French (e.g., when laws are cited). Laws are voted and codified in French. 

The country's head of state, the Grand-Duke's website is in French, however his personal Christmas speech is done in Luxembourgish (although a French translation is provided).  In the Grand-Duke's Christmas speech in 2018 like in the past, he spoke in Luxembourgish for the most part of the speech. However when he was talking about the importance of foreigners in Luxembourg, he suddenly spoke in French as this the most used language that resident foreigners use.

Mass media
In the written press, most newspapers such as Tageblatt and Lëtzebuerger Journal are in German, while there are a few such as Le Quotidien that are in French.  On the other hand, the newspaper of record Luxemburger Wort is trilingual with most articles written in German, but also sometimes written in French and Luxembourgish, often on the same page.

On TV and on the radio, Luxembourgish is mainly used, for example the main news programme RTL's de Journal. Spoken Luxembourgish used in news broadcasts tends to be strongly influenced by standard German in pronunciation and idiom. Radio broadcasters are under pressure to translate news releases sourced from German press agencies in real time and have no special training in the prose style of Luxembourgish. As a result, news tends to be superficially translated into Luxembourgish. Syntax mostly follows standard German and many words and idioms from standard German appear unmodified. Phonology is also affected with the resulting use of intonation phrases alien to Luxembourgish.

Advertising 
In terms of advertising, which language is used depends on three factors: media, audience and origin. In written advertisements like billboards, newspaper and magazine adverts, catalogues and posters, the usual language of communication is French. On occasion to give a local flavour, it is written in part in Luxembourgish. Public signage is usually in French, with occasional markings in Luxembourgish, German and/or English.

For television commercials broadcasting on RTL, if the advert is for an international product or service like a car or a television, it is entirely in French. However, if it is a domestic product or service like for example like Rosport mineral water or Luxair, the spoken language is in Luxembourgish with the taglines in French, or less frequently in Luxembourgish or English.

Daily use
Generally, Luxembourgish is used for most day-to-day life in informal settings throughout the country. Standard German and French are reserved for formal settings and ceremonies. Furthermore, French is commonly used in the hospitality industry. Most newspapers and printed media are in Standard German. Approximately 98% of Luxemburgians can use at least one second language.

Written Luxembourgish

Luxembourgish has a literary tradition that began in the 1820s with the development of serious forms of poetry, followed by drama and eventually narrative prose. However, the average Luxembourger finds Luxembourgish texts difficult to read. Schoolchildren do not read Luxembourgish until the age of 11 or 12. Even then not all teachers adhere to the curriculum requirement to teach written Luxembourgish, some preferring to teach standard German instead, and consequently some students may not be taught written Luxembourgish. As a result, only a minority of literary-minded intellectuals find reading Luxembourgish easy or enjoyable. The majority of Luxembourgers regard their language as a spoken one only. In recent years, the rise of texting and social media has made written Luxembourgish a lot more common between the younger generations. 

For private correspondence, language choice tends to reflect social class. Members of the upper middle and upper classes tend to prefer French, although Luxembourgish may be used to convey a sense of close identification with one's nationality. German tends to be viewed negatively among the upper class, with the assumption that anyone writing in German has a poor mastery of French. Despite this, a minority of members of the upper class do prefer standard German when corresponding with close relatives. Use of German becomes more prominent the lower down the social scale one goes, followed by Luxembourgish, with French tending to be the least popular among the lower classes.

Generally speaking, for correspondence between people who are related, standard German is preferred, followed by French and Luxembourgish equally, although social status has an influence. When people who are unrelated correspond, use of Luxembourgish drops off dramatically, and it tends not to be used at all between strangers. The choice of Luxembourgish therefore appears to reflect the closeness of the ties between the two people corresponding.

See also

 Languages of Luxembourg
 Luxembourgish#Claims of endangered status

Notes

References
 DICKES, P.; BERGOZA, Guayarmina, Les compétences linguistiques auto-attribuées.  Les cahiers du CEPS/INSTEAD, Population & Emploi, cahier 2010-19, Septembre 2010. ISSN 2077-3048.
 FEHLEN, F., BaleineBis : Une enquête sur un marché linguistique multilingue en profonde mutation - Luxemburgs Sprachenmarkt im Wandel. RED N° 12, SESOPI Centre Intercommunautaire, 2009.
 WEBER, J.J. Multilingualism, Education and Change Frankfurt, Peter Lang Verlag, 2009
 HORNER, K. and WEBER, J.J. The language situation in Luxembourg, Current Issues in Language Planning 9,1, 2008, 69-128
  Projet Moien!, Sproochenhaus Wëlwerwoltz (Hg.), Lëtzebuergesch: Quo Vadis? Actes du cycle de conférences, Mamer: Ondine Conseil 2004
 WEBER,N. The universe under the microscope: The complex linguistic situation in Luxembourg, in De Bot, C./Kroon, S./Nelde, P./Vande Velde, H. (eds.), Institutional Status and use of languages in Europe Bonn, Asgard, 2001, 179-184
 MAGÈRE, Ph., ESMEIN, B., POTY, M., La situation de la langue française parmi les autres langues en usage au Grand-Duché de Luxembourg. Luxembourg, Centre culturel français, 1998
 NEWTON, G. (ed.) Luxembourg and Lëtzebuergesch: Language and Communication at the Crossroads of Europe, Oxford, 1996

Languages of Luxembourg
Language education